"We're No Here" is a song by Scottish post-rock band, Mogwai, from their 2006 album, Mr Beast.  It has been used in a number of films and television programmes. It is one of the more basic, heavier, rock-oriented songs from Mr Beast, often being used as a set closer - usually ending in a sonic assault of feedback.  The title is apparently based on a Celtic football club chant about former manager Martin O'Neill.

Uses  
  Miami Vice soundtrack 
 Torchwood episode "Cyberwoman" 
 Top Gear Season 9 Episode 3's American Roadtrip.
 Les Revenants, for which Mogwai wrote the soundtrack.

References

Mogwai songs
2006 songs
Instrumentals
Songs written by Barry Burns